The 1996 season of the 3. divisjon, the fourth highest association football league for men in Norway.

Between 22 and 24 games (depending on group size) were played in 19 groups, with 3 points given for wins and 1 for draws. All group winners were promoted to the 2. divisjon, as well as some of the best runners-up.

Tables 

Group 1
Råde – promoted
Sprint-Jeløy – promoted
Grue
Kolbotn
Rygge
Trysil
Kongsvinger 2
Brandval
Moss 2
Nordby
Flisa – relegated
Oppegård – relegated
Galterud – relegated

Group 2
Østsiden – promoted
Mercantile – promoted
Hafslund
Skeid 2
Lisleby
Tune
Oppsal
Fagerborg
Greåker
KFUM
Bækkelaget – relegated
Nordstrand – relegated

Group 3
Gjøvik-Lyn – promoted
Eidsvold Turn – promoted
Vardal
Aurskog/Finstadbru
Kolbu/KK
Trøgstad/Båstad
Sørumsand
Kvik Halden
Toten
Hærland
Askim – relegated
Blaker – relegated
Biri – relegated

Group 4
Lørenskog – promoted
Stange
Rælingen
Vinstra
Follebu
Sel
Fart
Bjerke
Lillehammer FK
Nittedal
Hammerseng – relegated
Nes – relegated

Group 5
Årvoll – promoted
Asker
Stabæk
Drafn
Gjelleråsen
Birkebeineren
Åmot
Holmen
Grorud
Høybråten og Stovner – relegated
Steinberg – relegated
Skiold – relegated

Group 6
Stokke – promoted
Langesund
Skotfoss
Snøgg
Urædd
Rjukan
Flint
Borre
Kragerø
Storm
Holmestrand – relegated
Stathelle – relegated

Group 7
Jerv – promoted
Larvik Turn – promoted
Øyestad
Randesund
Sørfjell
Tjølling
Lyngdal
Kvinesdal
Mandalskameratene
Fram
Nesjar – relegated
Giv Akt – relegated

Group 8
Sola – promoted
Staal
Stavanger
Ulf-Sandnes (-> Sandnes FK)
Varhaug
Figgjo
Egersund
Nærbø
Hundvåg
Ganddal – relegated
Riska – relegated
Bjerkreim – relegated

Group 9
Trott – promoted
Odda
Åkra
Nord
Bremnes
Buøy
Radøy
Skjold
Solid
Torvastad – relegated
Voss – relegated
Erdal – relegated

Group 10
Brann 2 – promoted
Vadmyra
Ny-Krohnborg
Nymark
Follese
Hovding
Bjørnar
Florvåg
Austrheim
Lyngbø – relegated
Bjarg – relegated
Telavåg – relegated

Group 11
Førde – promoted
Sogndal 2
Tornado
Florø
Fjøra
Jotun
Eid
Sandane
Jølster
Høyang
Anga
Måløy – relegated
Vik – relegated

Group 12
Volda – promoted
Velledalen og Ringen
Bergsøy
Hødd 2
Hareid
Aksla
Stranda
Langevåg
Valder
Spjelkavik
Vartdal – relegated
Åram – relegated

Group 13
Træff – promoted
Averøykameratene – promoted
Kristiansund
Clausenengen
Kvass/Ulvungen
Tomrefjord
Bryn
Sunndal
Ekko/Aureosen
Surnadal
Isfjorden
Søya

Group 14
Nidelv – promoted
Hitra
Singsås
Tynset
KIL/Hemne
Røros
NTHI
Strindheim 2
Fosen
Brekken
HIL/Fevåg – relegated
Rissa – relegated

Group 15
Ranheim – promoted
Kvamskameratene
Heimdal
Vinne
Bangsund
Nessegutten (-> Levanger FK)
Sverre (-> Levanger FK)
Tranabakkan
Fram
Sverresborg – relegated
Varden – relegated
Vuku – relegated

Group 16
Mosjøen – promoted
Mo – promoted
Bodø/Glimt 2
Saltdalkameratene
Nesna
Grand Bodø
Nordre Meløy
Sørfold
Åga – relegated
Brønnøysund
Korgen
Sømna
Bodøkameratene – relegated

Group 17
Lofoten – promoted
Narvik/Nor – promoted
Skånland
Vågakameratene
Leknes
Medkila
Landsås
Flakstad
Stokmarknes
Beisfjord
Kabelvåg – relegated
Alsvåg – relegated

Group 18
Tromsø 2 – promoted
Skarp
Salangen
Lyngen/Karnes
Balsfjord
Ramfjord
Ulfstind
Nordreisa
Storfjord
Pioner
Tromsdalen 2
Mellembygd – relegated
Ringvassøy – relegated

Group 19
Polarstjernen – promoted
Hammerfest
Bossekop
Kirkenes
Bjørnevatn
Honningsvåg
Alta 2
Nordkinn
Nordlys
Sørøy Glimt
Kautokeino
Norild – relegated
Rafsbotn – relegated

References

Norwegian Third Division seasons
4
Norway
Norway